Samitha Dulan Kodithuwakku also known as Samitha Dulan (born 10 July 1990) is a Sri Lankan Paralympic track and field athlete. He made his maiden Paralympic appearance representing Sri Lanka at the 2020 Summer Paralympics.

Biography 
Samitha Dulan was born and raised up in Deniyaya, Southern Province. He pursued his primary and secondary education at the Deniyaya Central Collage and Rahula College.

He suffered an impairment in his right leg after a tragic motorbike accident and took up para sports in 2017. He serves as a Corporal of Sri Lanka Military Police and represents Military Police Sports Club.

Career 
His fourth-place finish in the men's F44 category of the javelin throw event at the 2019 World Para Athletics Championships in Dubai secured his berth in order to obtain direct slot to compete at the 2020 Summer Paralympics.

He claimed bronze medal in the men's javelin throw F64 category at the 2020 Tokyo Paralympics. He won Sri Lanka's second medal at the 2020 Summer Paralympics and noticeably his medal achievement was Sri Lanka's second medal in a single day on 30 August 2021.

References 

1990 births
Living people
Paralympic athletes of Sri Lanka
Sri Lankan male javelin throwers
Medalists at the 2020 Summer Paralympics
Paralympic bronze medalists for Sri Lanka
Track and field athletes with disabilities
Paralympic medalists in athletics (track and field)
Athletes (track and field) at the 2020 Summer Paralympics
People from Southern Province, Sri Lanka